PP-232 Vehari-IV is a Constituency of Provincial Assembly of Punjab, in Pakistan.

General elections 2013

General elections 2008

See also
 PP-231 Vehari-III
 PP-233 Vehari-V

References

External links
 Election commission Pakistan's official website
 Awazoday.com check result
 Official Website of Government of Punjab

Provincial constituencies of Punjab, Pakistan